The Railway Stakes is a Group One New Zealand horse race. Held at Ellerslie on New Year's Day, it is held over 1200 metres, and is one of New Zealand's feature sprint races.

Among its most notable winners are:

 Avantage, the winner of the 2021 Railway, the 2020 and 2021 Telegraph Handicap, 2020 Otaki-Maori Weight for Age, Foxbridge Plate and Bonecrusher New Zealand Stakes. 
 Bawakalasana the winner of both the Railway and the Telegraph Handicap in 1999.
 Diamond Lover in 1987 who broke the Ellerslie track record, running 1:07.73.
 Loader, the winner of the Railway and Telegraph Handicap in 1996.
 Mayo Gold in 1970, the first winner to finish under 1:10.
 the great Mr Tiz, who won this race three times (1989-1991), the 1991 Waikato Sprint and the 1989 and 1990 Telegraph Handicap.
 Rizzio, the 1948 and 1949 winner.
 Tudor Light, in 1977.
 Yahabeebe, the 1957 and 1958 winner.

Some of the biggest upsets in the history of the race were in 2009 when Jacowils triumphed at odds of 104-1, and in 2011 when Miss Raggedy Ann won the race as the 86-1 outsider.

In 2014, the exceptional filly Bounding became the first 3-year-old to win the Railway in 33 years.

Winners Since 1970

The following are brief details of the previous winners of the Railway Stakes.

See also

 Recent winners of major NZ sprint races
 Telegraph Handicap
 Waikato Sprint
 Auckland Cup
 Zabeel Classic

References

 N.Z. Thoroughbred Racing Inc.
 http://www.racenet.com.au
 http://www.nzracing.co.nz
 http://www.tab.co.nz
 http://www.racebase.co.nz
 The Great Decade of New Zealand racing 1970-1980. Glengarry, Jack. William Collins Publishers Ltd, Wellington, New Zealand.
 New Zealand Thoroughbred Racing Annual 2018 (47th edition). Dennis Ryan, Editor, Racing Media NZ Limited, Auckland, New Zealand.
 New Zealand Thoroughbred Racing Annual 2017 (46th edition). Dennis Ryan, Editor, Racing Media NZ Limited, Auckland, New Zealand.
 New Zealand Thoroughbred Racing Annual 2008 (37th edition). Bradford, David, Editor.  Bradford Publishing Limited, Paeroa, New Zealand.
 New Zealand Thoroughbred Racing Annual 2005 (34th edition). Bradford, David, Editor.  Bradford Publishing Limited, Paeroa, New Zealand.
 New Zealand Thoroughbred Racing Annual 2004 (33rd edition). Bradford, David, Editor.  Bradford Publishing Limited, Paeroa, New Zealand.
 New Zealand Thoroughbred Racing Annual 2000 (29th edition). Bradford, David, Editor.  Bradford Publishing Limited, Auckland, New Zealand.
 New Zealand Thoroughbred Racing Annual 1997  (26th edition). Dillon, Mike, Editor. Mike Dillon's Racing Enterprises Ltd, Auckland, New Zealand.
 New Zealand Thoroughbred Racing Annual 1995 (24th edition). Dillon, Mike, Editor. Mike Dillon's Racing Enterprises Ltd, Auckland, New Zealand.
 New Zealand Thoroughbred Racing Annual 1994 (23rd edition). Dillon, Mike, Editor. Meadowset Publishing, Auckland, New Zealand.
 New Zealand Thoroughbred Racing Annual 1991  (20th edition). Dillon, Mike, Editor. Moa Publications, Auckland, New Zealand.
 New Zealand Thoroughbred Racing Annual 1987 (16th edition). Dillon, Mike, Editor. Moa Publications, Auckland, New Zealand.
 New Zealand Thoroughbred Racing Annual 1985 (Fourteenth edition). Costello, John, Editor. Moa Publications, Auckland, New Zealand.
 New Zealand Thoroughbred Racing Annual 1984 (Thirteenth edition). Costello, John, Editor. Moa Publications, Auckland, New Zealand.
 New Zealand Thoroughbred Racing Annual 1982 (Eleventh edition). Costello, John, Editor. Moa Publications, Auckland, New Zealand.
 New Zealand Thoroughbred Racing Annual 1981 (Tenth edition). Costello, John, Editor. Moa Publications, Auckland, New Zealand.
 New Zealand Thoroughbred Racing Annual 1980 (Ninth edition). Costello, John, Editor. Moa Publications, Auckland, New Zealand.
 New Zealand Thoroughbred Racing Annual 1979 (Eighth edition).Costello, John, Editor. Moa Publications, Auckland, New Zealand.
 New Zealand Thoroughbred Racing Annual 1978 (Seventh edition).Costello, John, Editor. Moa Publications, Auckland, New Zealand.
 New Zealand Thoroughbred Racing Annual 1976. Costello, John, Editor. Moa Publications, Auckland.

Horse races in New Zealand